Lamison is an unincorporated community in Wilcox County, Alabama, United States, located along Alabama State Route 5.

Geography

Notable person
Leonard W. Thornhill, naval aviator who participated in the sinking of the Japanese aircraft carrier Shōhō and was posthumously awarded the Navy Cross. USS Thornhill (DE-195) was named in his honor.

References

Unincorporated communities in Alabama
Unincorporated communities in Wilcox County, Alabama